Amarenomyces is a genus of fungi in the family Botryosphaeriaceae; according to the 2007 Outline of Ascomycota, the placement in this family is uncertain. A monotypic genus, it contains the single species Amarenomyces ammophilae. The associated anamorph is the genus Amarenographium.

References

Botryosphaeriales
Monotypic Dothideomycetes genera